A sāmaṇera (Pali); , is a novice male monastic in a Buddhist context. A female novice is a śrāmaṇerī or śrāmaṇerikā (Sanskrit; Pāli: sāmaṇerī).

Etymology 
The sāmaṇera is a Pali language diminutive equivalent to the Sanskrit term śrāmaṇera, which indicates an ascetic practitioner. Therefore, sāmaṇera might be said to mean "small or young renunciate". In some South and Southeast Asian Buddhist traditions, the term refers to someone who has taken the initial pravrajya vows but not the upasampada or full ordination. The pratimokṣa rules do not apply to them and they do not take part in the recital of the rules on uposatha days.

The Sanskrit word śrāmaṇerikā is the feminine form of śrāmaṇera.

History 
The account provided in the literature of South Asian Buddhism (and adopted by other Buddhist sects) is that when Gautama Buddha's son Rāhula was seven years old, he followed the Buddha, saying "Give me my inheritance." The Buddha called Sariputta and asked him to ordain Rāhula, who became the first sāmaṇera.

Overview 

In the Vinaya (monastic regulations) used by many South Asian Buddhist sects, a man under the age of 20 cannot ordain as a bhikṣu (monk) but can ordain as a sāmaṇera. Sāmaṇeras (and sāmaṇerīs – the equivalent term for girls) keep the Ten Precepts as their code of behaviour and devote themselves to the religious life during breaks from secular schooling, or in conjunction with it if devoted to formal ordination. In other cultures and Buddhist traditions (particularly North East Asia, and those in the West that derive from these lineages), monks take different sets of vows, and follow different customary rules.

The Ten Precepts upheld by sāmaṇeras are:
Refrain from killing/harming living things.
Refrain from stealing.
Refrain from unchastity (sensuality, sexuality, lust).
Refrain from lying.
Refrain from taking intoxicants.
Refrain from taking food at inappropriate times (after noon).
Refrain from singing, dancing, playing music or attending entertainment programs (performances).
Refrain from wearing perfume, cosmetics and garland (decorative accessories).
Refrain from sitting on high chairs and sleeping on luxurious, soft beds.
Refrain from accepting money.

Ordination differs between sāmaṇeras and srāmaṇerīs.

Transition to full ordination 
After a year or at the age of 20, a sāmaṇera will be considered for the upasampada or higher ordination as a bhikṣu. Some monasteries will require people who want to ordain as a monk to be a novice for a set period of time, as a period of preparation and familiarization.

Ordination of women 

A woman is to be ordained, according to the traditional vinayas, by both a monk and a nun, first as a śrāmaṇerī. Śrāmaṇeras and śrāmaṇerīs keep the Ten Precepts as their code of behaviour, and are devoted to the Buddhist religious life during a break from secular schooling, or in conjunction with it if devoted to formal ordination.

After a year or at the age of 20, she will be ordained as a full bhikṣuṇī (Pali: bhikkhunī).

See also 

 Anagarika
 International Congress on Buddhist Women's Role in the Sangha
 Maechi
 Nun
 World Buddhist Sangha Council
Ordination
Sangha
Poy Sang Long
Shinbyu
Śikṣamāṇā
Unsui

External links 
The Bhikkhunis' Code of Discipline (Bhikkhunī Pāṭimokkha') Translated from the Pali by Thanissaro Bhikkhu
Buddhist Monastic Code II: Bhikkhunis
the website of Bhante Sujato's Writings contains several (ancient and modern) texts on the role and ordination of women in Buddhism.
Bhikkhuni committee of the ASA includes a large resource of articles regarding Bhikkhunis
Monastic Resources - Training
"Female Monks In Buddhism", by Dhammacaro (07/23/2005).
"Vinaya Pitaka", brief description includes "Order of ordination for men and women...."

References 

Buddhist titles
Beginners and newcomers
Buddhist monasticism
Women's rights in religious movements
Pali words and phrases
Buddhism and children